Gary Edwin Wimmer (born March 9, 1961) is a former American football linebacker who played in the National Football League for one season. He played college football at Stanford.

Professional career
Wimmer was selected by the Oakland Invaders as a territorial selection in the 1983 USFL Draft, but did not play for the team.

Wimmer signed with the Seattle Seahawks as an undrafted free agent following the 1983 NFL Draft. He played three games for the Seahawks in the 1983 season. He played primarily on special teams and did not record a statistic.

References

External links
 Pro Football Archives bio

1961 births
Living people
Sportspeople from Idaho
Players of American football from Idaho
American football linebackers
Stanford Cardinal football players
Seattle Seahawks players
People from Pocatello, Idaho